Forest Side is a hamlet on the Isle of Wight, off the south coast of England.

It is located to the east of the A3054 road, and adjacent to Parkhurst Forest.

Citations

Hamlets on the Isle of Wight